Two Japanese warships have borne the name Natsushima:

 , a  launched in 1911 and sold in 1927
 , a  launched in 1933 and sunk in 1944

Imperial Japanese Navy ship names
Japanese Navy ship names